is a 2022 Japanese drama film based on a novel with a same name written by Mizuki Tsujimura and illustrated by manga artist group CLAMP. The film is directed by Kōhei Yoshino, written by Yōsuke Masaike, distributed by Toei Company, and stars Riho Yoshioka, Tomoya Nakamura, Tasuku Emoto and Machiko Ono. The film was released in Japan in May 28, 2022.

Premise
"Hitomi Saito, who has jumped into the world of the anime industry, makes her directorial debut and competes for the title of "Haken" (supremacy) with the star director of her dreams, Chiharu Ōji. Chiharu, who previously produced many mega-hit films, is returning to the director's chair for the first time in eight years. Hitomi struggles to win the title together with the peculiar producer and her unique colleagues."

Cast
Riho Yoshioka as Hitomi Saito
Tomoya Nakamura as Chiharu Ōji
Tasuku Emoto as Satoru Yukishiro
Machiko Ono as Kayoko Arishina
Kanji Furutachi as Koshigaya
Seiji Rokkaku as Seki
Marika Kouno as Aoi Shino
Asuka Kudō as Shuhei Monemori
Tomoya Maeno as Negishi
Karin Ono as Kazuna Namisawa
Yu Tokui as Maeyamada

Voice cast

Soundback: Playing Stone
Yuki Kaji as Ryūji
Megumi Han as Takaya
Hina Kino as Mayu
Show Hayami as Kanade's stone

Fate Front: Liddle Light
Rie Takahashi as Juri
Kana Hanazawa as Kiyora
Yui Horie as Del
Yū Kobayashi as Shiori
Reina Kondō as Nanaka
Nanami Tomaru as Kei
Sayaka Ohashi as Yuki

Romi Park serves as a narrator for both in-story anime films.

Production
In November 2021, it was announced that a live-action film adaptation of the novel Anime Supremacy!, written by Mizuki Tsujimura and illustrated by manga artist group CLAMP, was in the works, with Kōhei Yoshino directing the film and Yōsuke Masaike as a screenwriter. The cast for the film was announced in the same month, with Riho Yoshioka, Tomoya Nakamura, Tasuku Emoto and Machiko Ono as Hitomi Saito, Chiharu Ōji, Satoru Yukishiro and Kayoko Arishina respectively. Voice actors Yuki Kaji, Megumi Han, Rie Takahashi and Kana Hanazawa were cast as characters for the respective in-story anime films. The principal photography was done at Toei Companys filming studio in Tokyo. Atsutoshi Umezawa from Toei Animation supervised the depiction of the anime industry for the entire film. Genie High will perform the film's theme song, titled "Eclair".

The two in-story anime films were created for the live-action film as films being created and produced by two characters in the film: The first film, and the second film, . Soundback: Playing Stone was directed by Azuma Tani and character designed by Eisaku Kubonouchi, while Fate Front: Liddell Light was directed by Takashi Otsuka, and character designed by Takahiro Kishida. Both in-story anime films were produced by Production I.G.

Release
The film was released in Japan in May 28, 2022.

Reception

Industry reception
A special screening of the film was held on May 10, 2022 for the people in the Japanese animation industry, and made with positive responses.

Accolades

References

External links
Official movie site (in Japanese)

Production I.G
2020s Japanese-language films
Films based on Japanese novels
2022 drama films
2022 films
Films scored by Yoshihiro Ike
Japanese drama films
Toei Company films 

ja:ハケンアニメ!#映画